Jean-Pierre Foucault (born 23 November 1947 in Marseille) is a French television and radio host.
He was born  in Marseille, his mother was Jewish.
He was the host of Qui Veut Gagner des Millions ?, the French version of Who Wants to Be a Millionaire?, and the host of Zone Rouge, the French version of The Chair. He has been hosting the Miss France pageant since 1996 and hosted the Miss Europe in 2003, 2005 & 2006 pageant.

Foucault played himself in the 2006 film Mon Meilleur Ami directed by Patrice Leconte and starring Dany Boon as a taxi driver who wins the top prize in Qui Veut Gagner des Millions?. Foucault shares his life with Evelyn Jarre without being married. He has a daughter from a previous marriage, Virginia Foucault.

Radio
 2006-2014 : La Bonne Touche with Cyril Hanouna (2006-2011) on RTL
 2014-2016 : Les pieds dans le plat on Europe 1

Filmography
 2000 : Most Promising Young Actress, directed by Gérard Jugnot : Himself

References

External links

1947 births
Living people
French radio presenters
Mass media people from Marseille
French television presenters
20th-century French Jews
Beauty pageant hosts